Vojo Dimitrijević (Sarajevo 20 May 1910 – 12 August 1980, Sarajevo) was one of the most notable Yugoslav painters. As a young painter he was one of the pre-1945 generation giving precedence to social themes along with Danijel Ozmo, Ismet Mujezinović and Branko Šotra. After 1945 this was replaced by themes of reconstruction.

References

Artists from Sarajevo
1910 births
1980 deaths
Yugoslav painters
Serbs of Bosnia and Herzegovina
Bosnia and Herzegovina painters